Kenmare is a town in County Kerry, Ireland. 

Kenmare may also refer to:

Places
 Kenmare River, sea inlet in County Kerry
 Kenmare House, near Killarney
 Kenmare, North Dakota, USA

Transport
 Kenmare Street, a street in Manhattan, New York, USA

Other
 Earl of Kenmare, and earlier Viscount Kenmare, peerage extinct in 1953
 Kenmare lace, associated with the Kerry town
 Kenmare Resources, Irish mining company

See also
 Kenmare GAA (District Team)
 Kenmare Shamrocks GAA Club
 Kenmare Kestrels, fictional quidditch team